Neon Parish, New South Wales is a rural locality and a cadastral parish of Ularara County New South Wales.

The climate is semi-arid, featuring low rainfall, very hot summer temperatures and cool nights in winter.

History
The parish is on the traditional lands of the Paaruntyi people.

The Burke and Wills expedition were the first Europeans to the area, passing a few miles to the west.

Geography
The parish has a Köppen climate classification of BWh (Hot desert).

References

Parishes of Ularara County
Far West (New South Wales)